Lipovec is a municipality and village in Chrudim District in the Pardubice Region of the Czech Republic. It has about 200 inhabitants.

Administrative parts
The village of Licoměřice is an administrative part of Lipovec.

References

External links

Villages in Chrudim District